Dorothée Gilbert (born 25 September 1983) is a principal dancer with the Paris Opera Ballet.

Training 
 1990-1995	Toulouse National Conservatoire
 1995-2000	Paris Opéra Ballet School
2000	Joins the Corps de Ballet of the Paris Opéra
 2002	Promoted to Coryphée
 2004	Promoted to Sujet
 2005	Promoted to Première Danseuse
 2007	Nominated Etoile after a performance of Nutcracker (Nureyev) on 19 November

Awards 
 2002	Prix du public de l’AROP
 2004	Prix du Cercle Carpeaux
 2006	Prix Ballet 2000 (Cannes)
 2006	Prix Léonide Massine (Positano, Italy)

Repertoire 

Ashton
La fille mal gardée: Lise (in first Paris Opéra production, 2007)

Balanchine
Concerto Barocco; Liebeslieder Walzer (in first Paris Opéra production, 2003);
Symphony in C; Jewels (Emeralds); Rubis; Tchaikovsky – Pas de deux; Les quatres tempéraments, Apollon Musagète, who cares;

P.Bart
La petite danseuse de degas: rôle titre, la danseuse étoile

Béjart
Serait-ce la mort?

Coralli et Perrot
Giselle: title role

Cranko 
Onegin :  Tatiana

Forsythe
Pas./parts; Artifact Suite (in first Paris Opéra production, 2006); 
The Vertiginous Thrill of Exactitude

Kylián
Nuages

Lacotte
La Sylphide: Effie; Paquita: title role

Lander
Etudes: Soloist

Benjamin Millepied
Triade

Neumeier
La Dame aux camélias: Manon Lescaut, Prudence (in first Paris Opéra production, 2006); 3ème Symphonie de Mahler : The Angel

Nureyev
La Bayadère: Gamzatti; Third Variation
Nykia;
Swan Lake: Odette-Odile (Tokyo, 2007)
Cinderella:  Les soeurs
Don Quixote: Kitri
Nutcracker: Clara
Raymonda: title role, Henriette

Petipa 
Sleeping Beauty : title role

R. Petit
Carmen: Bandit woman; Proust ou les intermittences du coeur : Albertine

Robbins
The Concert: Ballerina; En Sol

First performances of new works 
2002	
Mi Favorita (José Martinez), Vevey (Switzerland) AndréAuria (Edouard Lock), 
Paris Opéra

2004	
O’Zlozony / O Composite (Trisha Brown), Paris Opéra

2007	
Donizetti Suite (Manuel Legris), tour to Japan Genus (Wayne McGregor), Paris Opéra

Partners 

Manuel Legris		
Liebeslieder Walzer, Etudes, Alles Walzer, Swan Lake, Paquita, Nutcracker, Nuages

Nicolas Le Riche		
La Fille mal gardée, Serait-ce la mort?

José Martinez 		
Etudes, Raymonda

Hervé Moreau 	    	
La Bayadère, Paquita, Eugène Onéguine

Benjamin Pech 	         
Etudes, Proust ou les intermittences du coeur

Jérémie Bélingard	
Paquita

Emmanuel Thibault	
Don Quixote

Alessio Carbone		
Giselle: Pas des Paysans, Tchaikovsky – Pas de deux, La Fille mal gardée (J.G. Bart), Rubis, Sleeping Beauty, Les quatres tempéraments;

Mathieu Ganio 		
Artifact-Suite, Donizetti Suite, In G Major, Casse Noisette, La petite danseuse de Degas, Giselle

Mathias Heymann	
Giselle,  Bayadère

Christophe Duquenne	
En Sol, Raymonda

Nicolas Paul		
Triade

Tours 

 2001	USA (Paris Opéra)
 2002	Brazil (Paris Opéra), Japan (Manuel Legris et ses Etoiles)
 2003	Japan (Paris Opéra, Manuel Legris et ses Etoiles)
	Cuba (19th Havana International Ballet Festival)
 2004	Chine (Paris Opéra)
 2005	Japan (Tokyo: La Traviata)
 2007	Japan (Manuel Legris et ses Etoiles)
 2009 	Australia (Opéra de Paris)
 2010	Japon (Opéra de Paris)

Filmography
 2015 Rise of a Star

References

External links 
 
 Official FanSite
 Official Channel on YouTube

French ballerinas
Gilbert
Living people
1983 births
Chevaliers of the Ordre des Arts et des Lettres